The Dr. Joseph M. Bynum House is a historic house in Rienzi, Mississippi, U.S.. It was built from 1876 to 1877 for Dr. Joseph Medicus Bynum, a physician from South Carolina. It was designed in the Gothic Revival architectural style. It has been listed on the National Register of Historic Places since November 24, 1997.

References

Houses on the National Register of Historic Places in Mississippi
Gothic Revival architecture in Mississippi
Houses completed in 1877
1877 establishments in Mississippi
National Register of Historic Places in Alcorn County, Mississippi